Pseudophyllus titan, is a species of "false leaf" bush-cricket (or katydid) of the subfamily Pseudophyllinae found in Mainland Southeast Asia, Malaysia, and Indonesia.  Commercialized framed specimens can often be found under the name "Sasuma grasshopper".  The type locality is Sylhet in Bangladesh.

There were also records from Kerio valley in Kenya, but this may be a misidentification: other genera in the tribe Pseudophyllini are similar in appearance.

Like many other species of crickets and grasshoppers, the male is capable of stridulation, producing a distinctive, bird-like chirp.

References

External links

Pseudophyllinae
Insects described in 1846
Orthoptera of Indo-China